The Eurovision Young Dancers 2017 was the fifteenth and final edition of the Eurovision Young Dancers competition. The final took place at the Prague Congress Centre in the Czech capital, Prague on 16 December 2017. This was the second consecutive time that the Czech national broadcaster, Česká televize (ČT), organised the contest. The event is aimed at young dancers aged between 16 and 21, competing in modern dances, be it solo or in couples, as long as they were not professionally engaged.

Paulina Bidzińska of  won the contest, with Patricija Crnkovič of  placing second (runner-up).

Location

On 7 July 2015, the Maltese city of Valletta was selected as the host city for the 2017 edition of the biennial Eurovision Young Dancers. The reasons behind this decision was to coincide the Young Dancers event alongside the European Capital of Culture, of which the city will be the organisers of a series of cultural events in 2018, all with a strong European dimension. The contest was scheduled to take place on 9 June 2017, with the Mediterranean Conference Centre originally proposed as the venue. However, on 19 November 2016 it was reported that the host broadcaster PBS were planning to host the contest in the open-air. It was announced on 24 December 2016 that the event would take place at the Grand Harbour.

In January 2017, the EBU announced that Maltese broadcaster PBS, who agreed to host the event in July 2015, had due to circumstances beyond their control been forced to cancel their staging of the competition. The EBU also stated they were looking for another host broadcaster but should one not be found in time the competition would not take place this year and was expected to return in 2019.

However, in May, during a press release about the national selection for the contest, the Polish broadcaster Telewizja Polska (TVP) confirmed that the contest would now take place in the Czech Republic later in the year. On 18 May 2017, Czech broadcaster Česká televize (ČT) confirmed that they would host the contest. It was later reported that the contest would take place on 16 December 2017. Slovenian broadcaster Radiotelevizija Slovenija (RTVSLO) confirmed that it would be held in Prague. The EBU confirmed on 22 June that the Forum Hall of the Prague Congress Centre would host the competition.

Hosting selection
Whereas the winning country at the Eurovision Song Contest goes on to host the following year's event, this method is not the case when it comes to the decision of selecting the hosts for the Eurovision Young Dancers. The event's Steering Group, conduct a meeting in which they discuss the countries who submitted an application to host the event, and make their final decision thereafter.

Format
The format consisted of dancers who were non-professional and between the ages of 16–21, competing in a performance of dance routines of their choice, which they had prepared in advance of the competition. All of the acts then took part in a choreographed group dance during 'Young Dancers Week'.

Jury panel
Jury members of a professional aspect and representing the elements of ballet, contemporary, and modern dancing styles, score each of the competing individual and group dance routines. Once all the jury votes have been counted, the two participants which received the highest total of points progress to a final round. The final round will involve a 90-second 'dual', were each of the finalists perform a 45-second random dance-off routine. The overall winner upon completion of the final dances will be chosen by the professional jury members. The jury members were as follows:

  – Daria Klimentová
  – Ambra Succi
  – Itzik Galili

Participating countries

This is the lowest number of participating countries in the history of the contest.

Final duel

Broadcasting
The following countries, listed in order of broadcasting dates, have confirmed that they broadcast the contest.

Other countries
For a country to be eligible for potential participation in the Eurovision Young Dancers, it needs to be an active member of the European Broadcasting Union (EBU).

Active EBU Members
  – Albania participated in the Eurovision Young Dancers 2015, however announced that they would withdraw from the contest in 2017.
  – The Austrian broadcaster Österreichischer Rundfunk (ORF) announced on 22 November 2016 that they had no plans to return in 2017.
  – The Finnish broadcaster Yleisradio (Yle) announced on 4 November 2016 that they had no plans to return in 2017.
  – The Latvian broadcaster Latvijas Televīzija (LTV) announced on 16 December 2016 that they had no plans to return in 2017.
  – The Dutch broadcaster NTR announced on 2 February 2017 that they would withdraw from the contest.
  – The San Marinese broadcaster San Marino RTV confirmed they would not debut in the contest on 11 January 2017.
  – The Ukrainian broadcaster National Television Company of Ukraine (NTU) announced on 22 December 2016 that they would not return in 2017 due to focusing their attention on preparations for hosting the Eurovision Song Contest 2017.

See also 
 ABU International Dance Festival 2017
 Eurovision Choir of the Year 2017
 Eurovision Song Contest 2017
 Junior Eurovision Song Contest 2017

References

External links 
 

2017 in the Czech Republic
Eurovision Young Dancers by year
Events in Prague
December 2017 events in Europe